The Karnataka State Film Awards 1987–88, presented by Government of Karnataka, to felicitate the best of Kannada Cinema released in the year 1987.

Lifetime achievement award

Film Awards

Other Awards

References

Karnataka State Film Awards